The Senior League World Series Central Region is one of six United States regions that currently sends teams to the World Series in Easley, South Carolina. The region's participation in the SLWS dates back to 1962, when it was known as the North Region.

Central Region States

Region Champions
As of the 2022 Senior League World Series.

Results by State
As of the 2022 Senior League World Series.

See also
Central Region in other Little League divisions
Little League – Central 1957-2000
Little League – Great Lakes
Little League – Midwest
Intermediate League
Junior League
Big League

References

Central
Senior League World Series
Baseball competitions in the United States
Sports in the Midwestern United States